Gadde Rajendra Prasad (born 19 July 1956) is an Indian actor who predominantly works in Telugu films. He is a recipient of four Andhra Pradesh state Nandi Awards, three SIIMA Awards, and three Santosham Film Awards.

Prasad made his debut in 1977 with Sneham and gained recognition with Manchu Pallaki (1982). He then went on to be starred in several successful comedy films such as Rendu Rellu Aaru (1986), Ladies Tailor (1986), Aha Naa-Pellanta! (1987), Appula Appa Rao (1991), and Mayalodu (1993). He received Nandi Award for Best Actor for Erra Mandaram (1991) and Aa Naluguru (2004). He has also received an Honorary doctorate from Andhra University. In 2012, he starred in the medical thriller Dream, for which he won the Royal Reel Award at the Canada International Film Festival.

He is fondly called "Nata Kireeti" and he has been honored with the title "Hasya Kireeti" by the Telugu Alliances of Canada, held at Mississauga. He was also honored to walk the green carpet at the IIFA film festival held in 2009, marking his performance in the English-language film, Quick Gun Murugun.

Early life
Prasad was born into a middle-class family to Gadde Venkata Narayana and Manikyamba in Nimmakuru, Andhra Pradesh. His parents hailed from Dondapadu, Krishna district, Andhra Pradesh. His father was a teacher. Prasad completed his graduation with a diploma in Ceramic Engineering before entering the film industry. He joined a company but had to resign from the job because he was too young. After witnessing the shooting of Tatamma Kala, he aspired to join the industry. Upon the suggestion of N.T.R and N. Trivikrama Rao, he joined an acting school.

Personal life
Prasad is married to Vijaya Chamundeswari. She is the daughter of Rama Prabha. They have a son and a daughter.

Career

Early career (1977 – 1985) 
Prasad made his debut as an actor on the silver screen with the film Sneham (1977), directed by Bapu. Initially, he worked as a dubbing artist and played many supporting roles. He played a supporting role in the film Ramarajyamlo Bheemaraju, starring Krishna, which fetched him a chance in 14 films.

Breakthrough as a lead & comedy actor (1985 – 2004) 

He was identified by director Vamsy to play a lead role in his film, Preminchu Pelladu. He rose to fame with Vamsy's Ladies Tailor. He continued to act in supporting roles while also playing lead roles. In a career of over 35 years, he acted in more than 200 Telugu films and few Tamil films. Prasad has been called a great comedy actor and is fondly called the King of Comedy and Natakireeti in Andhra Pradesh.

His collaboration with the director Jandhyala in Aha Naa Pellanta established him as an overnight star. He also made successful collaborations with directors Vamsy, E. V. V. Satyanarayana, S. V. Krishna Reddy and Relangi Narasimha Rao. Notably, Relangi made 32 films (out of 70 as a director) with Prasad.

Critically acclaimed roles (2004 – 2011) 
One major role which garnered him a lot of accolades was in the movie Aa Naluguru, for which he won the State Nandi Award for the second time in his career. Critically acclaimed films such as Mee Sreyobhilashi and Onamalu made him one of the most promising actors in Telugu film industry. He acted as Lord Hanuman in the blockbuster multi-star film Devullu.

In 2009, Prasad played the titular role in the English-language film, Quick Gun Murugun. The film was screened at the London Film Festival, the Indian Film Festival of Los Angeles, the New York Asian Film Festival and at The Museum of Modern Art, New York.

Supporting roles (2011 – present) 

He played remarkable characters as supporting artist in films such as Julai, Aagadu, S/O Satyamurthy, Srimanthudu and Nannaku Prematho as well as elderly characters in films like Dagudumoota Dandakore.

Telugu people who emigrated abroad would take Prasad's movies along with them, such was the popularity and impact of his films on at least two generations of Telugu people. The then prime minister P. V. Narasimha Rao too was a huge fan of Prasad.

In 2015, he was elected as a President of Movie Artist Association (MAA), against actress Jayasudha.

His recent film Senapathi steaming on Aha

Awards
Nandi Awards
Nandi Award for Best Actor (1991) for Erra Mandaram
Nandi Special Jury Award (1994) for Madam
Nandi Award for Best Actor (2004) for Aa Naluguru
Nandi Award for Best Character Actor (2014) for Tommy

South Indian International Movie Awards
SIIMA Award for Best Supporting Actor (Telugu) (2013) for Julai at 2nd SIIMA
SIIMA Award for Best Supporting Actor (Telugu) (2016) for Srimanthudu at 5th SIIMA
SIIMA Award for Best Supporting Actor (Telugu) (2019) for Mahanati at 8th SIIMA

CineMAA Awards
CineMAA Award for Best Outstanding Actor – Onamalu (2013)

Santosham Film Awards 

 Best Supporting Actor for Mahanati at 17th Santosham Film Awards 2019
Santosham Akkineni Nageswara Rao Smarakam Award at 16th Santosham Film Awards 2018
Best Supporting Actor for Srimanthudu at 14th Santosham Film Awards 2016

Telugu Book of Records Awardee 
 For continuously 10 years published as a Cover page picture on Ballem Cinema Directory 2016.

Filmography

Actor

Dubbing artist

References

External links

Living people
1956 births
Indian male film actors
Andhra University alumni
Telugu male actors
Telugu comedians
Nandi Award winners
People from Krishna district
Male actors from Andhra Pradesh
20th-century Indian male actors
Indian male comedians
21st-century Indian male actors
Male actors in Telugu cinema
South Indian International Movie Awards winners
CineMAA Awards winners
Santosham Film Awards winners